Morton Thompson (c. 1907 – July 7, 1953) was an American writer of newspaper journalism, novels and film screenplays.

Career
Amongst his works were a collection of journalistic memoirs called Joe, the Wounded Tennis Player, and the novels Not as a Stranger (which was turned into a film directed by Stanley Kramer) and The Cry and the Covenant. 

He had a column in the Hollywood Citizen-News which he signed "N.N.W.," explaining that the initials came from a Shakespeare line, "I am but mad when the wind is North North West."

Personal life
He was a friend of the writer Robert Benchley. His second wife, Frances Pindyck, a literary agent with the Leland Hayward Agency, represented Dashiell Hammett and Betty Smith, among others.

Thompson's Turkey
He was also the inventor of the recipe, Thompson Turkey.

Further reading 
Morton Thompson's Turkey Stuffing
An ode to Thompson's turkey - Chicago Tribune
Morton Thompson Turkey Recipe - Food.com
Morton Thompson's Turkey
Morton Thompson’s black turkey by Jeff Fournier, of 51 Lincoln, for Boston Herald - YouTube
Turkey-Recipe-Of-Morton-Thompson rec.food.cooking
Thompson's Turkey (TASTE with David Rosengarten, TV FOOD NETWORK) - Recipelink.com

A Turkey Tale | Notes from the Dreamtime
Thompson's Turkey - Chowhound

References

External links 
 
 

1900s births
1953 deaths
20th-century American journalists
20th-century American non-fiction writers
20th-century American novelists
20th-century American short story writers
20th-century American male writers
American male journalists
American male novelists
American male short story writers